Vojtěch Kubista (born 19 March 1993) is a professional Czech football player currently playing for FK Mladá Boleslav.

He made his league debut on 12 May 2013 in Czech First League match against FC Vysočina Jihlava.

His brother Jan Kubista is a middle-distance runner, as was his father, also named Jan Kubista.

External links

Czech footballers
Czech Republic youth international footballers
Czech Republic under-21 international footballers
1993 births
Living people
Czech First League players
FK Jablonec players
MFK Karviná players
Association football defenders
FK Mladá Boleslav players
Sportspeople from Jablonec nad Nisou